Jeremy Paul Kagan (born December 14, 1945) is an American film and television director, screenwriter, and television producer.

Early life
Born in Mount Vernon, New York, Kagan received his B.A. from Harvard University in 1967. He went on to attend the newly formed New York University Graduate Institute of Film & Television and was in the first class at the AFI Conservatory.

Film and television career
Kagan's feature film credits include the box-office hit Heroes (1977), The Big Fix (1978), a political comedy-thriller starring Richard Dreyfuss; The Chosen (1981), from the classic book of the same name by Chaim Potok; The Journey of Natty Gann (1985), the first American movie ever to win the Gold Prize at the Moscow International Film Festival; the underground comedy Big Man on Campus (1989); the cult classic fencing film By The Sword (1991); and the hybrid film Golda's Balcony (2006), from the hit play of the same name. His feature Shot was about what one bullet does to many lives.

He has also been a prolific television director, starting already in 1972 at the age of 26, directing "The Most Crucial Game", an episode in the second Columbo season. In 1996, Kagan won a Primetime Emmy Award for Outstanding Directing for a Drama Series for the Chicago Hope episode "Leave of Absence".  Other credits include the television movie Katherine: The Making of an American Revolutionary, which he also wrote, and Conspiracy: The Trial of the Chicago 8 for which he won the CableACE Award for Best Dramatic Special.  Kagan also directed Roswell: The UFO Conspiracy, which garnered a Golden Globe Award nomination.

Other television films include The Ballad of Lucy Whipple, Courage with Sophia Loren, Scott Joplin, Descending Angel  for HBO and for Showtime Color of Justice, Bobbie's Girl, and Crown Heights, about the riots in 1991 which won the Humanitas Award in 2004 for "affirming the dignity of every person." This film also received an NAACP Image Award and the Directors Guild nomination for best family film. Kagan also directed a movie episode of Steven Spielberg's Emmy winning Taken. He has worked on several other series shows including The West Wing, The Guardian, Resurrection Blvd., Picket Fences, Boomtown and more.  His recent animation films have been shown on JLTV and film festivals.

Kagan produced and directed the ten-part series The ACLU Freedom Files, in 2006 and 2007 which received a number of awards and was shown on Link TV, Court TV and PBS.  Kagan has made a number of short documentaries and advocacy dramatic films for NGOs including The Doe Fund which works with the homeless and formerly incarcerated, and The Democracy School a movement developing local governance, and Bioneers which advances achievements in environmental and social justice.

Other ventures
Kagan is a full tenured professor at the University of Southern California where he teaches the graduate courses in directing and has recently created the Center for Change Making Media which is a hub for research and training in advocacy cinematic genres. His production company ACTransformative Media has made numerous shorts including three for VaccinateLA.

He has served as artistic director at the Robert Redford's Sundance Institute and is on a National Board Member of the Directors Guild of America and chairperson of its Special Projects Committee which provides cultural and educational programs for the 19,000 members. In 2004 he was honored with the Robert Aldrich Award for "extraordinary service to the guild."

In his capacity with the Directors Guild of America, Kagan also moderates the group's annual roundtable discussion featuring that year's five nominees for Outstanding Directing – Feature Film.

Kagan is also the author of three books Directors Close Up and a "living" eTextbook Keys to Directing.  www.keystodirecting.com.

Personal life
Kagan lives in Venice, California, with his companion Anneke Campbell.  She is an author, and was a writer on the series Freedom Files. His daughter Eve is a graduate of the Harvard Ed School, and is a practicing psychologist, actress, writer, and yoga teacher.

Awards and nominations

References

External links

1945 births
Living people
Jewish American screenwriters
Harvard University alumni
AFI Conservatory alumni
American television directors
Television producers from California
American male screenwriters
Tisch School of the Arts alumni
Writers from Mount Vernon, New York
University of Southern California faculty
People from Venice, Los Angeles
Film directors from Los Angeles
Film directors from New York (state)
Screenwriters from California
Screenwriters from New York (state)
Television producers from New York (state)